Qualification for the 2001 FIBA European Championship, commonly called FIBA EuroBasket 2001, took place between 18 May 1998 and 27 January 2001. A total of eight teams qualified for the tournament. The top eight teams from EuroBasket 1999 earned direct qualification.

Format
A total of 32 teams participated. Competition consisted of three stages:

A preliminary round that consisted of seven teams that competed in a round-robin tournament that took place in Helsinki, Finland between 18 May and 24 May 1998. The top two teams advanced to the semi-final round. 
A qualifying round where the third through seventh teams from the preliminary round joined another eleven teams. The sixteen teams where divided into three round-robin groups, two of six teams each, and one of four teams. Each group competition took place in a different city. This stage was hosted by Norway, Slovak Republic and Switzerland and took place between 19 May and 23 May 1999. The top three teams from the groups with six teams and the top two teams from the group with four teams advanced to the semi-final round.
A semi-final round where the teams that advanced through the preliminary and qualifying rounds joined another fourteen teams. All twenty-four teams where then divided in four round-robin groups of six teams each. This stage took place between 24 November 1999 and 27 January 2001 and competition consisted of home and away legs, taking place in each of the participating countries. The top two teams from each group qualified for EuroBasket 2001.

Preliminary round

|}

Qualifying round

Group A (Kristiansand, Norway)
Times given below are in Central European Summer Time (UTC+02:00).

|}

Group B (Fribourg, Switzerland)
Times given below are in Central European Summer Time (UTC+02:00).

|}

Group C (Spišská Nová Ves, Slovakia)
Times given below are in Central European Summer Time (UTC+02:00).

|}

Semi-final round

Group A

|}
Rules=1) Points; 2) Head-to-head results; 3) Points difference; 4) Points scored.

Group B

|}

Group C

|}

Group D

|}

References

External links

qualification
1997–98 in European basketball
1998–99 in European basketball
1999–2000 in European basketball
2000–01 in European basketball
2001